Taavi Varm (born 2 June 1979, in Tallinn) is an Estonian artist.

Education
Taavi Varm studied at the Tallinn Art Gymnasium (Estonia) in 1991–97. In 1997–98 he studied at Sogndal Folk High School (Norway). After graduating from high school Varm continued his studies at the Tartu Art College (Estonia). In 2012, he graduated from the university with a bachelor's degree in media and advertisement design. His final thesis was the making of new media performance "FUNK KON". In 2013 began his studies on at Aalto University (Finland), master's degree in new media.

Work
Taavi Varm is a video and theater artist, designer, producer, idea generator, adviser – an interdisciplinary artist. Since 2001, he has been giving lectures in various Estonian universities (Tartu Art College, Estonian Academy of Arts, Tallinn University Baltic Film and Media School, University of Tartu Viljandi Culture Academy). As a video artist he has done over thirty theatre video and set design.

Selection of productions
 2017 Unity DOME – Brussels, Belgium
 2014 Estonian Song and Dance Celebration, Designer
 2013 Night Song Celebration "Järjepidevus" - visual creative advisor video mapping
 2012 Direction of play “FUNK KON”
 2012 Multimedia lab and Blackbox - preparation of public procurement and expert opinions (UT Viljandi Culture Academy)
 2011 LHV Bank video mapping
 2010–11 Estonian Music and Design Café (Tallinn 2011)
 2010 90th anniversary of Estonian Drama theatre video mapping 
 2010 MIMproject goes Helsinki (Tallinn, 2011) mimproject.org
 2009 Estonian Song and Dance Celebration animation clips – Orbital Vox
 2009 More & Gerda music video "Ma ei kuule sind"
 2008 Night Song Celebration "Märkamisaeg" video clips

Selection of projects
 2012 Direction of play "FUNK KON”
 2012 Multimedia lab and Blackbox – preparation of public procurement and expert opinions (UT Viljandi Culture Academy)
 2010–11 Estonian Music and Design Cafe – Idea, producer, project manager
 2009 Estonian XXV Song – and XVII Dance Celebration – visual identity, animations and visual creative advisor.
 2008 Night Song Celebration "Märkamisaeg" – visual creative advisor and animation
 2007 X Youth Song and Dance Celebration – visual identity, animations

Video Art, installations, video mapping, LIVE
 2018 Restaurant ULTIMA, Interactive LED light wall and ceiling “Shadow Rabbit” installation, Sotamaa, Helsinki, Finland
 2018 Estonia 100 Kira Skov/Maria Faust “In the beginning” concert at Brorson kirke, Copenhagen Denmark
 2018 EVR Cargo short movie and video projection, Tallinn
 2018 Estonia 100 „Põhjamaa pulss“ concert by Kristjan Järvi, Estonia, Tallinn
 2018 Estonia 100 Mapping on Freedom square – Tallinn Estonia
 2018 Estonia 100 “Eile nägin ma Eestimaad” live concert by Rasmus Puur, Pärnu Estonia
 2018 Estonia 100 – Flag Mapping – Tallinn Estonia
 2018 Estonia 100 „Nordic Passion“ tour – Estonia
 2018 “Rand ja Tuulberg 25”, cool mapping project, technical, Lennusadam, Estonia
 2017 Unity DOME – Brussels, Belgium
 2017 World Expo Astana 2017 Led animation and Sound Design – Georgian Pavilion
 2017 World Expo Astana 2017 VR pavilion – Sotamaa, Finnish Pavilion
 2017 Kaubamaja sound and space “Buttons edition”– Tartu Department store
 2017 Opening Concert, Estonia Presidency of the Council of the European Union -Tallinn
 2016 Kaubamaja sound and space – Tallinn Department store
 2016 Fazer Visitor Centre, 14 m interactive wall – Sotamaa, Helsinki
 2016 Fazer Visitor Centre, Fazer Blue factory mapping – Sotamaa, Helsinki
 2016 Estonia 98 gala/performance – Video mapping – Estonia Theatre
 2016 Ewert and two dragons – Live performance video – Tallinn
 2016 Velocipede – Live performance video for Maria Faust
 2016 Nordic Sounds – Live performance video for Villu Veski band – Nordic Hotel, Kumu
 2015 Estonian Chamber of Commerce 90 Years, Estonia Theatre, Estonia
 2014 Kuressaare merepäevad, Saaremaa, Estonia
 2013 BMW X5 presentationb in KUMU, Tallinn
 2013 Night Song Celebration "Järjepidevus", Tartu
 2013 Estonian National Public Library 95 years, Tallinn
 2013 Iiris single “Tigerhead” mapping on Estonian Foreign Ministry
 2012 “Narva College of the University of Tartu”, Narva
 2012 “Blue Sirius”, Port of Tallinn
 2011 “Song of the Tower Bells” – The closing ceremony of European Capital of Culture Tallinn 2011, Tallinn's Freedom Square
 2011 “LHV bank” – LHV Bank opening, City Plaza with Andres Tenusaar, Raivo Möllits, George Bigiakis, Aleks Tenusaar
 2011 “Objekt 2011” – opening, Tallinn's Freedom Square
 2010 “Hammaste tervise kuu”, Tallinn's Freedom Square with Taavet Jansen and Andres Tenusaar
 2010 “Dramatheater 90”, Drama theatre facade  with Taavet Jansen and Andres Tenusaar

Films
 2016 "Mistra" animation film – Mask
 2016 “Rock ON II” – FX, video mapping for feature movie – Mumbai, Nirvana Films
 2010 "Estonian Fairytales" – Enterprise Estonia
 2010 dance film "Young man listening to music on a bicycle”
 2009 music film "White Noise" for Märt-Matis Lill composition
 2008 stereo film "Fire Dots in the Darkness" for Märt-Matis Lill composition
 2006 "Vanadaami visiit" – stage designer Ain Nurmela's assistant
 2001 dance film "According to law" with Katrin Essensoniga Arvo Pärdi statue opening in Rakvere / Estonian National Television live

Theatre direction
 2017 “000- Xanax” work in progress, NUQ Festival, Tallinn
 2012 "FUNK KON" – Kanuti Gildi SAAL, Tallinn

Theatre video and set design
 2018 “KERES” – Ballet, Estonia, Vaba Lava
 2018 “Sweeney Todd“ – Vanemuine, Tartu
 2017 “Lapsepõlvebänd” – Vanemuine, Tartu
 2017 “000- Xanax” work in progress, NUQ Festival, Tallinn
 2017 “Nurjatu Saar” Rock Opera – Saaremaa, Estonia
 2016 “I’d rather dance with you” – Vaba Lava, RAAM
 2016 “Lumekuninganna” – Vanemuine, Tartu
 2015	“Lumekininganna” - Vanemuine
 2015	“Öö Pariisis” – Vanemuine
 2014	“Ooperi Fantoom” - Vanemuine
 2014	“12 Movements” – Cabaret Rhizome
 2012 "Tiiger, Tiiger!" – Endla Theatre
 2012 "Musta Pori Näkku" – Vanemuine
 2012 "Täna õhtul: Seeri Feibok” – Cabaret Rhizome
 2011 “Hamlet Anderson” – Endla Theater
 2011 “Nullpunkt” video + set design – Rakvere Theatre
 2011 “Reality Show” Open Tallinn 2011, Kalevi Sport Hall
 2011 “Võlanõudjad” – Estonian Drama Theatre
 2010 “Transformer” – Kanuti Gildi SAAL
 2010 “Quevedo” – Vanemuine theatre
 2010 “Bastien ja Bastienne” – Estonian Concert
 2010 “Vassiljev ja Bubõr ta tegid siia...” – Estonian Drama Theatre
 2010 “Kirjaklambritest vöö” – VAT Theatre
 2009 “Vombat” – Estonian Drama Theatre
 2008 “Ingel Ingel vii mind taeva“ – VAT Theatre
 2008 “Sigma tau C-705“ – Estonian Drama Theatre
 2007 “Salasõber“ – Endla theatre
 2007 nuunioon “LP 33 1/3 rpm “– kanuti gildi SAAL
 2007 “Jean d’Arc“ – Birgitta Festival
 2006 “Lumumm“ – Rakvere Theatre
 2006 “aaron:juuni“ – Rakvere Theatre
 2004 “Sebastian” – Tallinn City Theatre (with Andres Tenusaar)
 2004 “it’s getting so dark” Helena Tulve chamber opera – Tallinn City Theatre
 2002 “Kunksmoor ja kapten Trumm” – Estonian Drama Theatre
 2002 “Kajakamägi” – Estonian Drama Theatre
 2002 “Vapper keefir” – Estonian Puppet theatre
 2002 “aurora temporalis” – Tartu Teatrilabor / Lendav Hollandlane
 2002 “Erepunane lilleke” – Estonian Puppet Theatre
 2001 “ameerika” – Tartu Teatrilabor / Lendav Hollandlane
 2001 “une luup. uus elyseum” trailer – Tartu Teatrilabor / Lendav Hollandlane

Exhibitions
 2014	Dark Shadows, Helsinki Finland
 2000 „FASTsoulFOOD“ Obu Galerii, Paide Vallitorn, Tampere art school (with Martin Rästa)
 1995 „Moving Art“ Kullo Lastegalerii (with Andres Tenusaar)

Group exhibitions
 2017 “Puus on Tuul” – sound installation on group exhibition “Surnu Suusad”, Tallinn, Tartu
 2014 PASSIO MUSICAE, ATENEUM, Helsinki Finland
 2013 Aalto Media lab group exhibition, Helsinki Finland
 2001 G.Grupp Paide Vallitorn
 1998 Sogndali Cultiure House
 1996 Draakon Gallery

Articles
 2008–2009 Tech culture magazine “Maatriks”
 2011-2011 Tech culture magazine “21”

External links
 Varmstudio

1979 births
Living people
21st-century Estonian male artists
Artists from Tallinn